MX6 may refer to:

 Mazda MX-6, a car
 Meizu MX6, a smartphone 
 Min'an Electric MX-6, a car
 Dongfeng Fengdu MX6, a car